"When You're Gone" is a song by Canadian singer-songwriter Avril Lavigne from her third studio album, The Best Damn Thing (2007). It was released as the second single from the album on 19 June 2007, by RCA Records. Lavigne co-wrote the song with Butch Walker, whilst production was solely helmed by Walker. According to Lavigne, the song is about saying goodbye to and missing a person that one cares about.

Background
Avril Lavigne has said the song "is about being with someone you love, and you have to say goodbye, and all the little things you miss about them". The song may have been inspired by Lavigne's then-husband, Deryck Whibley, although in an interview in Northern Ireland with The Belfast Telegraph she did not confirm this. According to her, she did not intend the song to be a love song, but she was writing a slow song and the process brought out "all that emotional stuff" in her. "It's not cheesy, because I wrote it", she said. "If I was older, a professional writer coming up with all that, that would be lame."

Billboard magazine describes the song as "a power ballad with a piano and synth introduction". Composer Rob Mathes orchestrated the song with genuine string section, although the brief opening note, before the piano came in, was on a synthesizer.

Critical reception
"When You're Gone" has received mixed reviews from music critics.  Alex Nunn wrote that Avril hasn't lost her sense in ballads with this song. Stylus was mixed calling the song "turgid and humdrum," but "taken at times by an exhilarating slickness."  Dave Donnely was mixed to positive: "Ballad and expected next single 'When You're Gone' may be the best of the bunch, though it's superficially like any number of pop-rock ballads, with contemplative lyrics lending the album a little bit of emotional depth. The theme, separation from a lover, is universal, and the lyrics simple: "I always needed time on my own/I never thought I'd need you there when I cried/And the days feel like years when I'm alone/And the bed where you lie is made up on your side." PopMatters stated that this song tries to match "I'm With You" but it fails. On a more negative note, Darryl Sterdan of JAM! described the song as "a standard piano-and-strings weeper" and went on to tell the reader to skip-it.  In an AOL Radio listener's poll, "When You're Gone" was voted Lavigne's eighth best song.

Accolades

Chart performance
Before its release as a single in the United States, "When You're Gone" reached number ninety on the US Billboard Hot 100 and number 77 on the Billboard Pop 100, in the Billboard issue dated 5 May 2007. The song later re-entered the charts and peaked at numbers 24 and 16, respectively. It did well on the charts in Canada, where it reached number eight. As of September 2015, "When You're Gone" has sold 1,290,000 digital copies in the United States.

The single did well in European charts ending at number four of the European Hot 100. "When You're Gone" debuted at number thirty-two on UK Singles Chart, and peaked at number three. It ended the year as the 54th most purchased song in the UK. In Ireland, it reached number four. In the Continental Europe, "When You're Gone" peaked inside top twenty in countries such as Austria, Denmark,  France, Germany, Italy, Spain and Sweden. However, the song was a minor hit in Belgium (Flanders and Wallonia), where it failed to reach top twenty.

Music video

Background
The video was directed by Marc Klasfeld, who is most well known from his works of director for Sum 41's music videos. Lavigne came up with the concept for the video, which she said is very personal. Portions of the video were filmed at California State University, Northridge's Botanic Garden. The video was premiered on MuchMusic in Canada on 6 June 2007 during the 5 pm broadcast of MuchOnDemand. While in the United States it was premiered on MTV's TRL on 21 June. It reached the No. 1 spot on both TV music channel countdowns on August.

One year later the video won the People's Choice: Favourite Canadian Artist award during the 2008 MuchMusic Video Awards. As of 2021, the music video for "When You're Gone" has reached 440 million views on YouTube.

Synopsis

The video portrays three relationships in different age groups, but in the same situation involving these relationships on the verge of being destroyed. The first vignette involves a pregnant woman whose husband is fighting in the war. After his departure, she watches news of war casualties on the television and is distraught when she does not receive any texts from her husband telling her how he is doing. The second involves an elderly man whose wife has recently died. He becomes emotional when he looks over her clothes and mementos from their time together. The third involves a teenage couple walking in the park only to be caught by the girl's controlling mother who forbids them from seeing each other ever again. The mother locks her daughter in her bedroom, where the girl helplessly cries over the photos of her and her boyfriend on her camera. Interspersed are scenes of Lavigne wandering in a field and playing a piano in an abandoned house. In the end, the walls of the house collapse, and all three vignettes break out into daylight with the teenage girl returning to the place where the duo were caught, the elderly man making a toast to his wife in a graveyard, and the pregnant woman attending a military memorial service, where she receives a text from her husband saying: "I'm okay. I miss U."

Live performances
Lavigne performed the song during European and Asian festivals that took part of her 2007 Promotional Tour as well as TV shows and award shows worldwide.

Usage in other media
The song was used in the second-season finale of the MTV show The Hills, playing during the climatic "moving out" scene between former best friends Lauren Conrad and Heidi Montag. It was also used in the series 7 finale of Two Pints of Lager and a Packet of Crisps. The song is  used as the background music for the third generation Toyota Alphard commercial for the Japanese market, with Kate Winslet and Selena Gomez.

Track listings and formats
 European CD single
 "When You're Gone"  – 4:01
 "Girlfriend" (Dr. Luke Remix feat. Lil Mama) – 3:26
 Japanese CD single
 "When You're Gone" (Album Version) – 4:00
 "When You're Gone" (Instrumental) – 4:01
 "Girlfriend" (Japanese Version) – 3:37
 Australian, German, and Taiwanese CD single
 "When You're Gone"  – 4:01
 "Girlfriend" (Dr. Luke Remix feat. Lil Mama) – 3:25
 "Girlfriend" (The Submarines' Time Warp '66 Mix) – 3:12
 "When You're Gone" (video)

Credits and personnel
Credits and personnel are adapted from the "When You're Gone" CD single liner notes.
 Avril Lavigne – vocals, writer, background vocals
 Butch Walker – writer, producer, bass, guitars, keyboards, programming, percussion, background vocals
 Tom Lord-Alge – mixing
 Stephen Marcussen – mastering at Marcussen Mastering (Hollywood)
 Karl Egsieker – engineering at Pulse Recordings and Sunset Sounds
 Rob Mathes – string arrangement and conduction
 Josh Freese – drums

Charts

Weekly charts

Year-end charts

Certifications

Release history

References

External links
"When You're Gone" music video
Avril Lavigne's Official Site

2007 singles
Avril Lavigne songs
RCA Records singles
Sony BMG singles
Music videos directed by Marc Klasfeld
Pop ballads
Rock ballads
Songs written by Avril Lavigne
Songs written by Butch Walker
Songs about loneliness
2000s ballads
2006 songs
Song recordings produced by Butch Walker
Torch songs
Soft rock songs